Gender Identity Organization of Iran (GID) is an Iranian non-governmental organization established in 2008 to support people with gender identity problems.

The organization is composed of clinicians, psychiatrists and psychologists. The aim of the NGO is to help the target community with their medical, legal and social problems.

See also
LGBT rights in Iran

External links
Official homepage (in Persian)

Gender identity
Non-profit organisations based in Iran